Anara is a town located in Isiala Mbano, Imo State, Nigeria. Anara is a member of the Osuh (Osuh Ama) clan, regarded to as a brother to the Abba clan. The ancestors of both of the clans agreed to originally come from Abam, an Igbo group affiliated to the Aros.

The town is bordered by Amaraku, Eziama, Abba, amongst other communities.

It originated as eight villages, with Aguna being the oldest of them.

The population of Anara is approximately 70,000, however it is developing due to a recent influx of immigrants.

The town celebrates many festivities, including Anara Day,  the Awa festival, New Yam festival.

References

Towns in Imo State